Charles Stearns may refer to:

 Charles F. Stearns (1866–1946), Chief Justice of the Rhode Island Supreme Court
 Charles H. Stearns (1854–1936), Lieutenant Governor of Vermont
 Charles Thomas Stearns (1807–1898), member of the Minnesota Territorial Council
 Charles Woodward Stearns (1818–1887), American physician and author